Dead Water Diary is the debut album by Finnish band Soulcage, released in 2006.

Track listing
 "I Am We" - 03:21
 "With the Time I Run" - 03:55
 "Always Searching" - 03:18
 "Broken Friend" - 03:37
 "Phantom Limb" - 04:02
 "Misused Power" - 03:35
 "Shotdown Truth" - 03:33
 "The Division" - 04:36
 "Sum of Choices" - 03:12
 "The White Light" - 04:02
 "Dead Water Diary" - 03:06

2006 debut albums
Soulcage albums